93 Days is a 2016 Nigerian drama thriller film directed and co-produced by Steve Gukas. The film recounts the 2014 Ebola outbreak in Nigeria and its successful containment by health workers from a Lagos hospital. It stars Bimbo Akintola, Danny Glover and Bimbo Manuel with joint-production through Native FilmWorks, Michel Angelo Production and Bolanle Austen-Peters Production.

93 Days is dedicated to Ameyo Adadevoh, a Nigerian physician who played a key role in the containment of Ebola in Nigeria.

Plot
On 20 July 2014, Patrick Sawyer, a Liberian-American diplomat, arrives in Lagos, Nigeria.  He is immediately taken to First Consultants Medical Center after suffering from worsening symptoms.  One of his accompanying physicians, Dr. Ameyo Adadevoh, is concerned that he may have Ebola, even though Sawyer denies the suggestion; nevertheless, she decides to quarantine Sawyer and asks her staff to exercise caution when tending to him.

The next afternoon, the test results are returned, and Sawyer is confirmed to have Ebola.  Word travels quickly that there is a potential first case Ebola patient in Lagos, and soon news organizations around the world start broadcasting the news.  Nigeria immediately begins preparations for an Ebola epidemic.

Dr. Adadevoh meets with Dr. Wasiu Gbadamosi, who is in charge of the Yaba infectious facility, and Dr. David Brett-Major from the World Health Organization.  She finds the Yasu facility is under-equipped to handle Ebola patients.  On July 25, the physicians discover that Sawyer has died.  The First Consultants Medical Center begins enhanced precautions and monitors its staff for Ebola signs and symptoms.

The story centers on the sacrifices made by men and women who risked their lives to make sure the Ebola virus was contained, before it becomes an epidemic.

Cast
Seun Ajayi as Dr. Niyi Fadipe
Bimbo Akintola as Doctor Ameyo Adadevoh
Zara Udofia Ejoh as Nurse Justina Echelonu
Keppy Ekpeyong Bassey as Patrick Sawyer
Charles Etubiebi as Bankole Cardoso
Danny Glover as Dr. Benjamin Ohiaeri
Somkele Iyamah-Idhalama as Dr. Ada Igonoh
Seun Kentebe as Godwin Igonoh
Alastair Mackenzie as Doctor David Brett-Major
Bimbo Manuel as Wasiu Gbadamosi
Charles Okafor as Afolabi Cardoso
Gideon Okeke as Dr. Morris Ibeawuchi
Sola Oyebade as The Ambassador
Tim Reid as Dr. Adeniyi Jones

References

External links
 

2016 films
English-language Nigerian films
Films about viral outbreaks
Films scored by George Kallis
Films set in Nigeria
Films shot in Nigeria
Docudrama films
Drama films based on actual events
Films set in 2014
Films about death
Thriller films based on actual events
2016 thriller drama films
2016 drama films
Nigerian thriller drama films
Nigerian films based on actual events
Ebola in popular culture
2010s English-language films